Nitz 'N' Sony, also known as Nitin Arora & Sony Chandy, are an Indian music director and composer duo in the Hindi film industry, working together since 2006
They are both Hotel Management Graduates from the PUSA institute and are self taught musicians. 

Nitz 'N' Sony, have composed music for several Indian movies including Money Hai Toh Honey Hai starring Govinda and Swami starring Manoj Bajpai and Juhi Chawla.

Notable movies / work

See also

Bollywood
Teesri Aankh: The Hidden Camera

References

External links
Nitz 'N' Sony on YouTube

Indian film score composers
Indian musical duos